Dante is an NBC adventure/drama television series.

Dick Powell had previously played Dante in eight episodes of his Four Star Playhouse, initially written by Blake Edwards, who had previously created the radio drama Richard Diamond, Private Detective for Powell. There, Willie operates an illegal gambling operation in the back room of the "Inferno", which police soon shut down. The only regular from the Four Star Playhouse version to be cast in the series as well was Mowbray, who had first played a millionaire named Jackson who had gambled away his fortune and then worked as one of Dante's waiters. These episodes were subsequently rebroadcast under the collective title The Best in Mystery.

The TV cast were to have reunited in 1963 for an episode of the anthology series, The Dick Powell Show guest-starring Peggy Lee, but plans fell through following Powell's death in January 1963. Four Star President, David Charnay announced plans for a feature film revival in 1968 starring Howard Duff, but nothing came of it.

Episode list

References

External links
Dante at IMDB
Dante at CVTA

NBC original programming
1960 American television series debuts
1961 American television series endings
1960s American drama television series
Black-and-white American television shows
Television shows set in San Francisco
Television series by Four Star Television
Television series by 20th Century Fox Television
English-language television shows